Josefin Lillhage (born 15 March 1980) is a former swimmer from Sweden, who won the bronze medal in the 200 m freestyle at the 2005 World Aquatics Championships in Montreal, Quebec, Canada. She competed in four Olympiads: in 1996, 2000, 2004 and 2008.

Personal bests

Long course (50 m)

Short course (25 m)

Clubs
 Simavdelningen 1902
 Göteborg Sim (-1999)
 Väsby SS (1999-)

References

External links
 
 

1980 births
Living people
Olympic swimmers of Sweden
Swedish female medley swimmers
Swimmers at the 1996 Summer Olympics
Swimmers at the 2000 Summer Olympics
Swimmers at the 2004 Summer Olympics
Swimmers at the 2008 Summer Olympics
Swimmers from Gothenburg
Olympic bronze medalists for Sweden
Olympic bronze medalists in swimming
Swedish female freestyle swimmers
World Aquatics Championships medalists in swimming
Medalists at the FINA World Swimming Championships (25 m)
European Aquatics Championships medalists in swimming
Simavdelningen 1902 swimmers
Göteborg Sim swimmers
Väsby SS swimmers
Medalists at the 2000 Summer Olympics
20th-century Swedish women
21st-century Swedish women